was a Japanese Rakugo comedian. His trademark line was "Sō nansu, okusan!" (That's the way it is, madam!). Hayashiya Shōzō IX and Hayashiya Sanpei II are his sons and Yasuha is his daughter.

The Pokémon Wobbuffet is an homage to Sanpei.

References

1925 births
People from Taitō
1980 deaths
Rakugoka
20th-century comedians
Comedians from Tokyo